Ross V. "Flivver" Ford (March 25, 1900 – March 15, 1955) was an American football player and coach. He served as the head football coach at Troy University–then known as Troy State College–in 1924, compiling a record of 2–1–4. Ford played college football at Auburn University from 1921 to 1923.

Head coaching record

References

External links
 

1900 births
1955 deaths
American football fullbacks
American football tackles
Auburn Tigers football players
Troy Trojans football coaches